Radmir Faizov (born March 4, 1977) is a Russian former ice hockey goaltender.

Faizov played a total of three games in the Russian Superleague for Torpedo Yaroslavl. He featured in two games during the 1996–97 season and one game during the 1997–98 season.

Faizov played in the 1997 World Junior Ice Hockey Championships for Russia.

References

External links

1977 births
Living people
Ariada Volzhsk players
HC CSKA Moscow players
HC Dinamo Minsk players
Gazprom-OGU Orenburg players
Lokomotiv Yaroslavl players
HC Mechel players
Rubin Tyumen players
Russian ice hockey goaltenders
Sportspeople from Chelyabinsk